Hetsch is a surname of German origin. It may refer to the following people:

 Albert Hetsch (1812–1876), German doctor and theologian
 Gustav Friedrich Hetsch (1788–1864), German architect
 Heinrich Hetsch (1873–1947), German physician
 Ludwig Hetsch (1806-1872), German composer
 Philipp Friedrich von Hetsch (1758-1839), German painter

Surnames of German origin